The Midland Railway 1116A Class was a class of 0-4-0ST for shunting.  Ten  were built at Derby in the 1890s, five in 1893 and five in 1897.  They were closely related to the 1322 and 1134A classes.

Construction history
The ten locomotives were built at Derby Works in two batches of 5 each in 1893 and 1897. They were numbered initially as 1116A–1120A, 2359–2360 and 1131A–1133A, the A suffix indicating the duplicate list. They were renumbered as 1508–1517 in 1907.

Disposal
All were still in service at the Midland's 1907 renumbering. The first locomotive was withdrawn in 1921, leaving nine to pass to the London Midland and Scottish Railway at the 1923 grouping. All bar one were withdrawn by 1936, with the exception surviving until it was retired in 1955, having been renumbered 41516 by British Railways.

None were preserved.

References

External links 
 Class 0F-A Details at RailUK

1116A Class
1116A Class
Railway locomotives introduced in 1893
Standard gauge steam locomotives of Great Britain